Euphorbia polycarpa (formerly Chamaesyce polycarpa) is a species of spurge known by the common name smallseed sandmat. It is native to the southwestern United States and northern Mexico, especially the deserts and other dry, sandy areas. This is a perennial herb producing stems that trail along the ground to form a clump or mat, sometimes growing somewhat upright. The leaves are each under a centimeter long. They are round or oval-shaped and have triangular stipules at the bases. 
What looks like a single flower is actually an inflorescence of many staminate (male) flowers united around a single central pistillate (female) flower. Bracts surrounding the flower unit are white and petal-like. The fruit is a thin spherical capsule less than 2 millimeters wide layered over a seed.

"Chamae" derives from the Greek meaning "on the ground", referring to its spreading low lying growth near the ground, and "Syke" is from Greek for "fig".

Uses
Among the Zuni people, a warm gruel made with the plant and white cornmeal and taken to promote milk flow.

References

External links

Jepson Manual Treatment
USDA Plants Profile
Photo gallery

polycarpa
Flora of California
Flora of Baja California
Flora of Arizona
Flora of the Sonoran Deserts
Flora of the California desert regions
Natural history of the California chaparral and woodlands
Natural history of the Channel Islands of California
Natural history of the Colorado Desert
Natural history of the Peninsular Ranges
Natural history of the Santa Monica Mountains
Natural history of the Transverse Ranges
Plants used in traditional Native American medicine
Flora without expected TNC conservation status